Little Creatures is the sixth studio album by American rock band Talking Heads, released on June 10, 1985, by Sire Records. The album examines themes of Americana and incorporates elements of country music, with many songs featuring steel guitar. It was voted as the best album of the year in The Village Voice Pazz & Jop critics poll, and is the band's best-selling studio album, with over two million copies sold in the United States. The cover art was created by outsider artist Howard Finster, and was selected as album cover of the year by Rolling Stone.

Track listing

Personnel

Talking Heads
David Byrne – guitar, vocals
Chris Frantz – drums
Jerry Harrison – keyboards, guitar, backing vocals
Tina Weymouth – bass guitar, backing vocals

Additional musicians
Ellen Bernfeld – backing vocals on "Perfect World" and "Walk It Down"
Andrew Cader – washboard on "Road to Nowhere"
Erin Dickens – backing vocals on "Television Man" and "Road to Nowhere"
Diva Gray – backing vocals on "Road to Nowhere"
Gordon Grody – backing vocals
Lani Groves – backing vocals
Jimmy Macdonell – accordion on "Road to Nowhere"
Lenny Pickett – saxophones
Steve Scales – percussion
Naná Vasconcelos – percussion on "Perfect World"
Eric Weissberg – steel guitar on "Creatures of Love" and "Walk It Down"
Kurt Yahijian – backing vocals

Recording
Jack Skinner – mastering
Eric Thorngren – engineer, mixing
Melanie West – second engineer

Charts

Weekly charts

Year-end charts

Decade-end charts

Certifications and sales

References

Bibliography

 

1985 albums
Albums produced by David Byrne
Albums produced by Chris Frantz
Albums produced by Jerry Harrison
Albums produced by Tina Weymouth
Sire Records albums
Talking Heads albums